RSB may refer to:

Rajapur Saraswat Brahmins, an Indian Brahmin community
Rashid School For Boys, Dubai
Rebecca Sean Borgstrom, former name of role-playing game author Jenna Moran
Revolutionary Socialist League (Germany) (Revolutionär Sozialistischer Bund, RSB)
Rigi-Scheidegg-Bahn, a former mountain railway in Switzerland
Riverside School Board, Quebec, Canada
The reporting mark for the Rochester Subway
Roundtable on Sustainable Biofuels
 Royal Society for the Blind, a not-for-profit organisation servicing blind and visually impaired people in South Australia
 Royal Society of Biology, a learned society and professional association in the United Kingdom
 The former Swedish Red Pied or Rödbrokig Svensk Boskap breed of cattle